Puppy love, also known as a crush, is an informal term for feelings of romantic love, often felt during childhood and early adolescence. It is an infatuation usually developed by someone's looks and attractiveness at first sight.  Such feelings fade away when the object of attraction stays out of sight for a while, whereas the feeling of real love takes a long time to develop and does not fade with time and or in the absence of the other. It is named for its resemblance to the adoring, worshipful affection that may be felt by a puppy. Puppy love typically lasts between 2 months and 2 years, and is thought to be fueled by preadolescent hormones. Some scientists, however, think it is initiated as a result of the natural development of the brain at the onset of preadolescence.

The term can be used in a derogatory fashion, presuming the affair to be shallow and transient in comparison to other forms of love. Sigmund Freud, however, was far from underestimating the power of early love, recognizing the validity of "the proverbial durability of first loves".

Characteristics
Puppy love is a common experience in the process of maturing. The object of attachment may be a peer, but the term can also describe the fondness of a child for an adult. Most often, the object of the child's infatuation is someone years older, like a teacher, friend of the family, actor, or musician, about whom the child will spend their time daydreaming or fantasizing. 

A crush is described as a coming-of-age experience where the child is given a sense of individualism because they feel intimate emotions for a person not part of their own family.

In popular culture
Canadian singer Paul Anka wrote and released the single "Puppy Love" in 1960, reaching number 2 in the Billboard Hot 100. The remake by Donny Osmond peaked at number 1 in the UK Singles Chart and number 3 in the US in 1972. Country singer Dolly Parton's first single, released in the 1950s when she was a child, was also called "Puppy Love". Singer Barbara Lewis released a song entitled "Puppy Love" in January 1964. Australian rock band Front End Loader featured a song called "Puppy Love" on their 1992 eponymous album. Bow Wow released a song called "Puppy Love" in January 2001. Hip hop artist Brother Ali wrote a song about puppy love titled "You Say (Puppy Love)". The electric powwow group A Tribe Called Red released a song titled "Native Puppy Love" on their self-titled album.

F. Scott Fitzgerald wrote short stories "valuing the intuitiveness of puppy love over mature, reasoned affection...[its] 'unreal, undesirous medley of ecstasy and peace'".

See also
 Attraction
 Childhood friend
 Childhood sweetheart
 Infatuation
 Limerence
 New relationship energy
 Puppy love in mainland China
 Teen idol
Unrequited love

References

Romance
Child sexuality
Child development

da:Forelskelse